Reza Mustofa Ardiansyah (born 11 September 1989) is an Indonesian footballer who currently plays for Gresik United as a winger.

Career 
On December 25, 2014, he was announced as a Persebaya player.

Honours

Club 
Arema Cronus
Menpora Cup: 2013

References

External links 
 Profile at goal.com
 

Indonesian footballers
Living people
1989 births
Sportspeople from East Java
PS Mojokerto Putra players
Persewangi Banyuwangi players
Pesik Kuningan players
Persema Malang players
Arema F.C. players
Gresik United players
Persebaya Surabaya players
Indonesian Premier Division players
Liga 1 (Indonesia) players
Association football wingers